The results of the 2008 Nepalese Constituent Assembly election.

Bardiya

Bhaktapur

Ilam

Jhapa

Lalitpur

Manang

Palpa

Taplejung

Notes

References 

Elections in Nepal